Mohamed Abdel Mohamed (born 14 January 1968) is an Egyptian handball player. He competed in the 1992 Summer Olympics.
He placed 11th for the Egypt team during these games  with 1 win and five losses

References

1968 births
Living people
Handball players at the 1992 Summer Olympics
Egyptian male handball players
Olympic handball players of Egypt